Richard J. Phelan is a politician from the U.S. state of Illinois.  He was  special counsel to the House Ethics Committee investigating Speaker Jim Wright in the late 1980s. Phelan  was then elected as Cook County Board President from 1990 to 1994. His campaign was Chicago's and Illinois' top 1990 election in terms of coverage and importance, as Phelan brought a reform agenda, beating out the candidates of the Regular Cook County Democratic Party. His campaign included campaign manager Eric Adelstein, media consultant David Axelrod, field director Pete Giangreco, Rahm Emanuel, who did opposition research, issues director Don Wiener, fundraiser Mary Beth Sova, and field assistant Troy Deckert.

Phelan was an unsuccessful candidate for the Democratic Gubernatorial nomination in 1994.

References

Presidents of the Cook County Board of Commissioners
University of Notre Dame alumni
Georgetown University Law Center alumni
Year of birth missing (living people)
Living people